The term Asian plum may refer to two varieties of stone fruit from East Asia:

Prunus mume
Prunus salicina, native to China

See also
Spondias mombin (also called "hog plum")